The 2010 Nevada Wolf Pack football team represented the University of Nevada, Reno in the 2010 NCAA Division I FBS football season. The Wolf Pack were led by Chris Ault in his 26th overall and 7th straight season since taking over as head coach for the third time in 2004. They played their home games at Mackay Stadium and were members of the Western Athletic Conference (WAC). They finished the regular season 12–1 and 7–1 in WAC play to share the conference championship with Boise State and Hawaii. They were invited to the Kraft Fight Hunger Bowl where they defeated Boston College 20–13 to finish the season with a 13–1 record.

Schedule

Rankings

Personnel

Depth chart

Game summaries

Eastern Washington

Colorado State

California

at BYU

at UNLV

San Jose State

at Hawaii

Utah State

at Idaho

at Fresno State

New Mexico State

Boise State

at Louisiana Tech

vs. Boston College (Kraft Fight Hunger Bowl)

Players in the 2010 CFL Draft

Players in the 2011 NFL Draft

References

Nevada
Nevada Wolf Pack football seasons
Western Athletic Conference football champion seasons
Redbox Bowl champion seasons
Nevada Wolf Pack football